Crambus multiradiellus is a moth in the family Crambidae. It was described by George Hampson in 1898. It is found in the Brazilian states of Paraná and São Paulo.

References

Crambini
Moths described in 1898
Moths of South America